American Girl is a 2021 Taiwanese drama film directed as the debut feature by Fiona Roan Feng-i. It depicts the semi-autobiographical story of Fen Liang, who returns to Taiwan from the United States with her mother and younger sister after their mother is diagnosed with breast cancer, during the 2002–2004 SARS outbreak. The film is executive produced by acclaimed director Tom Shu-Yu Lin, and is now exclusively available in over 190 countries and territories on Netflix.

Cast 
 Karena Lam Wang Li-li (Lily)
 Kaiser Chuang as Liang Chong-hui
 Caitlin Fang as Liang Fang-yi (Fen)
 Audrey Lin as Ann
 Winnie Chang as Ting's mom
 Kimi Hsia as Ms. Su
 Brando Huang as Liu
 Bowie Tsang as Dr. Han

Critical reception
American Girl was officially selected in the 2021 Tokyo International Film Festival’s Asian Future competition section. The film won five Golden Horse Awards, including Best New Performer for Caitlin Fang, Best New Director for Fiona Roan Feng-i, Best Cinematography for Giorgos Valsamis, the Audience Choice Award, and the FIPRESCI Prize during the 58th Golden Horse Awards.

Accolades

References

External links 

 

Taiwanese drama films
2021 drama films
2020s English-language films
2020s Mandarin-language films
2021 multilingual films
2021 films
2021 directorial debut films
Taiwanese multilingual films